Paidia albescens is a moth of the family Erebidae. It was described by Otto Staudinger in 1892. It is found in Turkey.

References

Nudariina
Moths described in 1892